Oxycrepis is a genus of beetles in the family Carabidae first described by Louis Jérôme Reiche in 1843.

Species 
Oxycrepis contains the following 246 species:
 Oxycrepis accelerans Casey, 1918
 Oxycrepis adrimoides Straneo, 1991
 Oxycrepis aenescens Tschitscherine, 1900
 Oxycrepis affinis Straneo, 1991
 Oxycrepis affinis Tschitscherine, 1900
 Oxycrepis agilis (Dejean, 1828)
 Oxycrepis algidus Allen, 1972
 Oxycrepis alutona Will, 2020
 Oxycrepis amatonus Will, 2020
 Oxycrepis amplithorax Straneo, 1991
 Oxycrepis anchomenoides Straneo, 1955
 Oxycrepis anthracinus Allen & Ball, 1979
 Oxycrepis apicalis (G.R.Waterhouse, 1841)
 Oxycrepis apicatus Bates, 1871
 Oxycrepis argentinus Tschitscherine, 1900
 Oxycrepis arvulap Will, 2020
 Oxycrepis assimilis (Dejean, 1831)
 Oxycrepis ater Tschitscherine, 1901
 Oxycrepis attenuatus Bates, 1871
 Oxycrepis audouini (G.R.Waterhouse, 1841)
 Oxycrepis balli Allen, 1972
 Oxycrepis binotatus Allen & Ball, 1979
 Oxycrepis bolivianus Tschitscherine, 1900
 Oxycrepis bonariensis Straneo, 1991
 Oxycrepis brasiliensis Tschitscherine, 1900
 Oxycrepis brevicollis (Leconte, 1848)
 Oxycrepis brevis Straneo, 1991
 Oxycrepis brullei (G.R.Waterhouse, 1841)
 Oxycrepis brunneicornis Straneo, 1991
 Oxycrepis brunnescens Straneo, 1949
 Oxycrepis calathoides Bates, 1871
 Oxycrepis castanipes Straneo, 1991
 Oxycrepis catenarius Will, 2005
 Oxycrepis catharinae Tschitscherine, 1900
 Oxycrepis celeris (Dejean, 1828)
 Oxycrepis cervicalis Casey, 1918
 Oxycrepis charrua Anichtchenko, 2009
 Oxycrepis cincinnati Casey, 1924
 Oxycrepis circulus Allen, 1972
 Oxycrepis claripes Straneo, 1993
 Oxycrepis collucens Casey, 1918
 Oxycrepis confusus (Dejean, 1831)
 Oxycrepis conspicuus Mateu, 2000
 Oxycrepis cordata Tschitscherine, 1900
 Oxycrepis crenatus Leconte, 1852
 Oxycrepis creperus Bates, 1872
 Oxycrepis cribratellus Straneo, 1991
 Oxycrepis cubana Tschitscherine, 1903
 Oxycrepis curtatoides Straneo, 1949
 Oxycrepis curtatus Tschitscherine, 1903
 Oxycrepis curtonotus Bates, 1871
 Oxycrepis cuyabanus Straneo, 1991
 Oxycrepis davisoni Straneo, 1991
 Oxycrepis defanisi Straneo, 1991
 Oxycrepis depressibasis Straneo, 1991
 Oxycrepis dimidiaticornis (Dejean, 1828)
 Oxycrepis discolor Allen, 1972
 Oxycrepis dubius (Curtis, 1839)
 Oxycrepis duryi Wright, 1939
 Oxycrepis ecuadoricus Straneo, 1991
 Oxycrepis egae Straneo, 1949
 Oxycrepis elaphropus Tschitscherine, 1898
 Oxycrepis elegans (Dejean, 1831)
 Oxycrepis elnae Allen, 1972
 Oxycrepis elongatus Allen, 1972
 Oxycrepis elytralis Straneo, 1993
 Oxycrepis epiphytus Will, 2004
 Oxycrepis erraticus (Dejean, 1828)
 Oxycrepis extendus Allen, 1972
 Oxycrepis fasciatus Tschitscherine, 1900
 Oxycrepis fasciolatus Tschitscherine, 1900
 Oxycrepis flavicauda Tschitscherine, 1900
 Oxycrepis floridana Leconte, 1878
 Oxycrepis franiai Straneo, 1991
 Oxycrepis fraus Allen, 1972
 Oxycrepis fulvicornis Bates, 1871
 Oxycrepis fulvostigma Bates, 1871
 Oxycrepis fulvus Straneo, 1991
 Oxycrepis fuscipes (Brulle, 1834)
 Oxycrepis gebi Will, 2020
 †Oxycrepis gelidus (Scudder, 1877)
 Oxycrepis geminatus Bates, 1872
 Oxycrepis gibbus Allen, 1972
 Oxycrepis gracilis Bates, 1871
 Oxycrepis gracilus Will, 2004
 Oxycrepis gravescens Bates, 1871
 Oxycrepis guttula Tschitscherine, 1901
 Oxycrepis humeralis Straneo, 1991
 Oxycrepis icarus Will & Liebherr, 1997
 Oxycrepis idiocentrus Tschitscherine, 1898
 Oxycrepis infimus Bates, 1882
 Oxycrepis integer Tschitscherine, 1900
 Oxycrepis interceptus Chaudoir, 1873
 Oxycrepis interruptus Tschitscherine, 1900
 Oxycrepis iricolor Straneo, 1991
 Oxycrepis irideus Straneo, 1949
 Oxycrepis irideus Straneo, 1993
 Oxycrepis janeiranus Straneo, 1991
 Oxycrepis kayae Straneo, 1991
 Oxycrepis kochalkai Straneo, 1991
 Oxycrepis laetipes Straneo, 1991
 Oxycrepis laevicollis Bates, 1871
 Oxycrepis laevinota Will, 2020
 Oxycrepis latibasis Straneo, 1993
 Oxycrepis latifascia Straneo, 1991
 Oxycrepis latiusculus Straneo, 1991
 Oxycrepis leistoides Bates, 1871
 Oxycrepis lepidus Allen, 1972
 Oxycrepis leucocera Reiche, 1843
 Oxycrepis leucotelus Bates, 1871
 Oxycrepis littleorum Allen & Ball, 1979
 Oxycrepis longior Straneo, 1993
 Oxycrepis longiusculus Straneo, 1991
 Oxycrepis lucens Chaudoir, 1868
 Oxycrepis macroderus Bates, 1871
 Oxycrepis macula Straneo, 1991
 Oxycrepis maculatus Straneo, 1958
 Oxycrepis maindroni Tschitscherine, 1901
 Oxycrepis major Straneo, 1949
 Oxycrepis marginalis Straneo, 1991
 Oxycrepis marginepunctatus Straneo, 1991
 Oxycrepis martinezi (Mateu, 1976)
 Oxycrepis mattoanus Tschitscherine, 1900
 Oxycrepis melas Straneo, 1953
 Oxycrepis micans Chaudoir, 1868
 Oxycrepis microderus Bates, 1872
 Oxycrepis minasianus Straneo, 1991
 Oxycrepis minimus Straneo, 1951
 Oxycrepis minor (Chaudoir, 1843)
 Oxycrepis mirei Straneo, 1991
 Oxycrepis modicus Tschitscherine, 1901
 Oxycrepis moritzi Tschitscherine, 1898
 Oxycrepis negrei Straneo, 1967
 Oxycrepis nicki Straneo, 1955
 Oxycrepis nitidulus (Leconte, 1848)
 Oxycrepis nocticolor Darlington, 1934
 Oxycrepis notula Motschulsky, 1866
 Oxycrepis obscurus Straneo, 1949
 Oxycrepis olivaceus Bates, 1882
 Oxycrepis omiltemi Allen & Ball, 1979
 Oxycrepis oophagus Costa & Vanin, 2011
 Oxycrepis opaculus Bates, 1871
 Oxycrepis orbicollis Straneo, 1991
 Oxycrepis ornatellus Straneo, 1991
 Oxycrepis ornatus Putzeys, 1878
 Oxycrepis ovaticollis Bates, 1871
 Oxycrepis pactinullus Allen, 1972
 Oxycrepis panamensis Casey, 1914
 Oxycrepis paraguayensis Straneo, 1949
 Oxycrepis parallelus Casey, 1918
 Oxycrepis parvulus Chaudoir, 1868
 Oxycrepis paulensis Straneo, 1993
 Oxycrepis photophilus Straneo, 1991
 Oxycrepis piceolus Chaudoir, 1868
 Oxycrepis piciventris (Leconte, 1848)
 Oxycrepis picticauda Bates, 1871
 Oxycrepis pictoides Straneo, 1991
 Oxycrepis pictus Tschitscherine, 1900
 Oxycrepis planicollis Straneo, 1991
 Oxycrepis planoculis Straneo, 1991
 Oxycrepis politissimus Bates, 1871
 Oxycrepis posticus (Brulle, 1843)
 Oxycrepis pravitubus Allen, 1972
 Oxycrepis profundestriatus Straneo, 1991
 Oxycrepis proximus Chaudoir, 1868
 Oxycrepis pseudomajor Straneo, 1991
 Oxycrepis punctatissimus Straneo, 1991
 Oxycrepis punctibasis Straneo, 1949
 Oxycrepis punctimargo Straneo, 1991
 Oxycrepis punctisulcis Straneo, 1958
 Oxycrepis punctulatus Straneo, 1949
 Oxycrepis pusillus Leconte, 1853
 Oxycrepis quadribasis Straneo, 1991
 Oxycrepis quadrinotatus Bates, 1871
 Oxycrepis quinarius Will & Liebherr, 1997
 Oxycrepis rasutulis Will, 2020
 Oxycrepis recta (Say, 1823)
 Oxycrepis rectangulus Leconte, 1878
 Oxycrepis rectibasis Straneo, 1991
 Oxycrepis reflexicollis Straneo, 1991
 Oxycrepis remotus Allen, 1972
 Oxycrepis ripicola Straneo, 1949
 Oxycrepis robustus Allen, 1972
 Oxycrepis rossi Allen, 1972
 Oxycrepis rotundatus Straneo, 1991
 Oxycrepis rotundicollis Straneo, 1991
 Oxycrepis rubescens Bates, 1871
 Oxycrepis rubricatus Bates, 1891
 Oxycrepis rubromaculatus Straneo, 1955
 Oxycrepis rubroniger Straneo, 1991
 Oxycrepis rufangulus Bates, 1872
 Oxycrepis ruficornis Tschitscherine, 1900
 Oxycrepis rufostigma Bates, 1871
 Oxycrepis saccisecundaris Allen, 1972
 Oxycrepis saphyrina (Chaudoir, 1843)
 Oxycrepis schadei Emden, 1949
 Oxycrepis scortensis Will, 2005
 Oxycrepis sculptilis Bates, 1884
 Oxycrepis semperfidelis Will, 2008
 Oxycrepis sericeus Straneo, 1955
 Oxycrepis sericiventris Straneo, 1991
 Oxycrepis similis Straneo, 1991
 Oxycrepis simillimus Straneo, 1991
 Oxycrepis simplex (Dejean, 1828)
 Oxycrepis sinuatellus Straneo, 1991
 Oxycrepis sinuatus Straneo, 1991
 Oxycrepis spinigrandis Allen, 1972
 Oxycrepis spinilunatus Allen, 1972
 Oxycrepis spinosus Will, 2005
 Oxycrepis stenolophoides Straneo, 1949
 Oxycrepis stockwelli Allen & Ball, 1979
 Oxycrepis straneoi Will & Liebherr, 1997
 Oxycrepis strigomeroides Straneo, 1991
 Oxycrepis subcordicollis Bates, 1871
 Oxycrepis subfuscus Tschitscherine, 1900
 Oxycrepis subparallelus Bates, 1871
 Oxycrepis subquadratus Straneo, 1991
 Oxycrepis subsinuatus Straneo, 1991
 Oxycrepis subvittatus Straneo, 1953
 Oxycrepis sulcatus Bates, 1871
 Oxycrepis taeniatus Leconte, 1852
 Oxycrepis tapiai Will, 2005
 Oxycrepis tenebrionides Bates, 1871
 Oxycrepis tetrastigma Bates, 1871
 Oxycrepis trapezicollis Straneo, 1991
 Oxycrepis tropicus Allen, 1972
 Oxycrepis tucumanus (Dejean, 1831)
 Oxycrepis uniformis Allen, 1972
 Oxycrepis unilobus Allen, 1972
 Oxycrepis unispinus Allen, 1972
 Oxycrepis unistigma Bates, 1882
 Oxycrepis uruguaicus Tschitscherine, 1903
 Oxycrepis variabilis Straneo, 1991
 Oxycrepis velocipes Casey, 1918
 Oxycrepis velox (Dejean, 1828)
 Oxycrepis ventralis Straneo, 1993
 Oxycrepis virens Tschitscherine, 1901
 Oxycrepis viridescens (Bates, 1871)
 Oxycrepis vittatus Bates, 1871
 Oxycrepis vulneratus Casey, 1918
 Oxycrepis whiteheadi Allen, 1972
 Oxycrepis willinki (Mateu, 1984)
 Oxycrepis xanthopus Bates, 1871
 Oxycrepis xipromus Will, 2020
 Oxycrepis yasuni Will, 2005
 Oxycrepis yeariani Allen, 1972

References

Pterostichinae